Besbeel or Besebaal  is a village in Zgharta District, in the Northern Governorate of Lebanon.

References

External links
Ehden Family Tree 

Populated places in the North Governorate
Zgharta District